The Neoproterozoic Oxygenation Event (NOE), also called the Second Great Oxidation Event (the first having occurred during the Palaeoproterozoic), was a time interval between around 850 and 540 million years ago which saw a very significant increase in oxygen levels in Earth's atmosphere and oceans. Bringing an end to the Boring Billion, a period of extremely low atmospheric oxygen spanning from the Statherian to the Tonian, the NOE was the second major increase in environmental oxygen on Earth, though it was not as major as the Great Oxidation Event (GOE). Unlike the GOE, it is unclear whether the NOE was a synchronous, global event or a series of asynchronous, regional oxygenation intervals with unrelated causes.

Evidence for oxygenation

Carbon isotopes
Beginning around 850 Mya to around 720 Mya, a time interval roughly corresponding to the Late Tonian, between the end of the Boring Billion and the onset of the Cryogenian “Snowball Earth”, marine deposits record a very significant positive carbon isotope excursion. These elevated δ13C values are believed to be linked to an evolutionary radiation of eukaryotic plankton and enhanced organic burial, which in turn indicate a spike in oxygen production during this interval. Further positive carbon isotope excursions occurred during the Cryogenian. Although several negative carbon isotope excursions, associated with warming events, are known from the Late Tonian all the way up to the Proterozoic-Phanerozoic boundary, the carbon isotope record nonetheless maintains a noticeable positive trend throughout the Neoproterozoic.

Nitrogen isotopes
δ15N data from 750 to 580 million year-old marine sediments hailing from four different Neoproterozoic basins show similar nitrogen isotope ratios to modern oceans, with a mode of +4% and a range from -4% to +11%. No significant change is observed across the Cryogenian-Ediacaran boundary, implying that oxygen was already ubiquitous in the global ocean as early as 750 Mya, during the Tonian period.

Sulphur isotopes
Seawater sulphate δ34S values, which saw a gradual increase over most of the Neoproterozoic punctuated by major drops during glaciations, show a significant positive excursion during the Ediacaran, with a corresponding decrease in pyritic δ34S. High fractionation rates between sulphate and sulphide indicate an increase in the availability of sulphate in the water column, which in turn is indicative of increased reaction of pyrite with oxygen. In addition, genetic evidence points to the occurrence of a radiation of non-photosynthetic sulphide-reducing bacteria during the Neoproterozoic. Through bacterial sulphur disproportionation, such bacteria further deplete marine sulphide of heavier sulphur isotopes. Because such bacteria require significant amounts of oxygen to survive, an oxygenation event during the Neoproterozoic raising oxygen concentrations to over 5-18% of modern levels is believed to have been a necessary prerequisite for the diversification of these microorganisms.

Strontium isotopes
δ13C can only reliably indicate changes in net primary productivity and oxygenation if the rates of weathering into the oceans and carbon dioxide outgassing remain constant or increase, since a decrease in either of these could cause a positive δ13C excursion through continued preferential biological consumption of carbon-12 by existing communities while the supply of available carbon decreased, without indicating an increase in primary productivity and oxygen production. The ratio of strontium-87 to strontium-86 is used as a determinant of the relative contribution of continental weathering to the ocean's nutrient supply; an increase in this ratio, as observed throughout the Neoproterozoic and into the Cambrian until reaching a peak at the end of the Cambrian, suggests a rise in continental weathering and bolsters evidence from carbon isotope ratios for high oxygenation in this interval of time.

Chromium isotopes
Surface oxidation of Cr(III) to Cr(VI) causes isotopic fractionation of chromium; Cr(VI), typically present in the environment as either chromate or dichromate, has elevated values of δ53Cr, or the ratio of chromium-53 to chromium-52, whereas bacterial reduction of Cr(VI) to Cr(III) is associated with negative chromium isotope excursions. Following the riverine transport of oxidised chromium into the ocean, the reaction reducing Cr(VI) back into Cr(III) and subsequently oxidising ferrous iron into ferric iron is highly efficient at sequestering Cr(VI), as is the precipitation of Cr(III) with ferric oxyhydroxide, meaning that chemically precipitated chromium isotope ratios in sediments abundant in ferric iron accurately reflect seawater chromium isotope ratios at the time of deposition. Because efficient oxidation of Cr(III) to Cr(VI) is only possible in the presence of the catalyst manganese dioxide, which is only stable and abundant at high oxygen fugacities, a positive excursion of δ53Cr indicates an increase in atmospheric oxygen concentrations. Banded iron formations deposited during the Neoproterozoic consistently display highly positive δ53Cr values, from 0.9% to 4.9%, demonstrating the era's oxygenation of the atmosphere.

Causes

Increase in nitrogen fixation
During the Boring Billion, open ocean productivity was very low compared to the Neoproterozoic and Phanerozoic as a result of the absence of planktonic nitrogen fixing bacteria. The evolution and radiation of nitrogen-fixing bacteria and non-nitrogen-fixing picocyanobacteria capable of occupying marine planktonic niches and consequent changes to the nitrogen cycle during the Cryogenian are believed to be a culprit behind the rapid oxygenation of and removal of carbon dioxide from the atmosphere, which also helps explain the development of extremely severe glaciations that characterised this period of the Neoproterozoic.

Increase in day length
The slowdown of the Earth's rotation and corresponding increase in day length has been suggested as a possible cause of the NOE on the basis of experimental findings that cyanobacterial productivity is higher during longer periods of uninterrupted daylight compared to shorter periods more frequently interrupted by darkness.

Phosphorus removal
The increasing diversity of eukaryotes has been proposed as a cause of increased deep ocean oxygenation by means of phosphorus removal from the deep ocean. The evolution of large, multicellular organisms led to increased amounts of organic matter sinking to the seafloor. This, combined with the evolution of benthic filter feeders, is believed to have shifted oxygen demand further down in the water column, which would resulted in a positive feedback loop wherein phosphorus was removed from the ocean, which reduced productivity and decreased oxygen demand, which in turn led to increasing oxygenation of deep ocean water. Increasingly well oxygenated oceans enabled further eukaryotic dispersal, which likely acted as a positive feedback loop that accelerated oxygenation.

Consequences

Glaciation
The rapid increase in organic carbon burial as a result of the increased rates of global photosynthesis, occurring in conjunction with an increase in silicate weathering of continental flood basalts resulting from the breakup of the supercontinent Rodinia, is believed to have been a trigger of the “Snowball Earth” Sturtian and Marinoan glaciations during the Cryogenian, the middle period of the Neoproterozoic.

Biological diversity
Over the course of the Ediacaran period, the oceans gradually became better oxygenated, with the time interval immediately after the Gaskiers Glaciation displaying evidence of significantly increasing marine oxygen content. The rapid diversification of multicellular life during this geologic period has been attributed by some authors to an increase in oxygen content, enabling the iconic oxygen-consuming multicellular eukaryotes of the Ediacaran biota to become ubiquitous and widespread. Initially restricted to deeper, colder waters that possessed the most dissolved oxygen, metazoan life gradually expanded into warmer zones of the ocean as global oxygen levels rose.

See also
Great Oxidation Event
Avalon Explosion
Cambrian Explosion

References 

Neoproterozoic events
Origin of life
Oxygen
Events in the geological history of Earth
Evolution of the biosphere
Meteorological hypotheses